Masashi Adachi (阿達 雅志 Adachi Masashi, b. September 27, 1959) is a Japanese politician who serves as a member of the House of Councillors and as an advisor to Prime Minister Yoshihide Suga.

Early life 
Adachi was born in Sakyo-ku, Kyoto, and grew up in Fukui, Sakai, and Takatsuki. He graduated from the University of Tokyo and joined Sumitomo Corporation in 1983, where he worked on rail car exports to the United States. He obtained an MCJ and LLM from the New York University School of Law in 1993, and became qualified as a lawyer in New York. He thereafter worked in the legal department of Sumitomo, and in the executive office of its Chinese subsidiary. He left Sumitomo in 2000, and thereafter worked for his father-in-law, Shinji Sato (a Diet member and son of Prime Minister Eisaku Sato), from 2003 to 2004. He then worked for the law firm of Paul Weiss in Tokyo from 2004 to 2014.

Political career 
He ran as a Liberal Democratic Party candidate for the House of Councillors in the 2007 election but lost He joined the law school faculty of Nihon University as an adjunct professor in 2008. He again ran as an LDP candidate in the 2010 House of Councillors election and lost.

He finally entered the House of Councillors as a runner-up after Yukari Sato resigned in December 2014 to run in the 2014 Japanese general election, and won re-election in the 2016 House of Councillors election.

He was appointed as a vice-minister for the Cabinet Office and Ministry of Land, Infrastructure, Transport and Tourism in 2018 under Prime Minister Shinzo Abe.

References

External links 

 Official website (Japanese)

Living people
1959 births
People from Kyoto
University of Tokyo alumni
Academic staff of Nihon University
American lawyers
Members of the House of Councillors (Japan)
Liberal Democratic Party (Japan) politicians